The Lisbon Lions is the nickname given to the Celtic team that won the European Cup at the Estádio Nacional in Lisbon, Portugal on 25 May 1967, defeating Inter Milan 2–1. The name is likely due to the fact that the Lisbon-based Sporting football club's mascot is a lion, and the club wear green and white striped jerseys like Celtic. All but two members of the 15 man squad were born within 10 miles of Celtic Park in Glasgow, Scotland (Bobby Lennox, who was born 30 miles away in Saltcoats, and Tommy Gemmell, who was born in Motherwell 11 miles away). Celtic's style was the antithesis of the cynical – but highly effective – defensive style of Inter. Jimmy Johnstone described the team's style as "like the Dutch speeded-up".

In the stadium where his father Valentino played his last match, Sandro Mazzola opened the scoring for Inter with a 7th-minute penalty after Jim Craig had brought down Renato Cappellini. The Italians then retreated into their famous 11-man defence. Inter did not win a single corner and forced Celtic goalkeeper Ronnie Simpson to make only two saves. Celtic had two shots off the crossbar, and 39 other attempts on goal, 13 of which were saved by Italian goalkeeper Giuliano Sarti, seven were blocked or deflected, and 19 were off-target. Craig made amends for his penalty mistake on 63 minutes, when he laid off the ball for Tommy Gemmell to fire home for the Celtic equaliser. With 83 minutes on the clock, Gemmell was allowed space, and he played the ball to Bobby Murdoch, whose long-range shot was deflected by Stevie Chalmers past Sarti into the net.

Celtic were the first British club to win the European Cup, and still the only Scottish club to have reached the final. Celtic are one of only three clubs to have won five trophies in a single season. They reached the final again in 1970 but were beaten 2–1 by Feyenoord after extra time in the San Siro Stadium in Milan.

Celtic's results in the 1966–67 European Cup

Celtic team in the final
Ronnie Simpson
Jim Craig 
Tommy Gemmell 
Bobby Murdoch 
Billy McNeill (captain)
John Clark 
Jimmy Johnstone 
Willie Wallace 
Stevie Chalmers 
Bertie Auld 
Bobby Lennox
John Fallon (substitute goalkeeper, not used)

Jock Stein (Manager)
Sean Fallon (Assistant Manager)
Neil Mochan (Trainer)

Notes: Celtic did not wear numbers on their shirts at this time. The numbers shown were sewn onto their shorts.

A second goalkeeper was the only substitute allowed at the time. The other members of the squad who played in Europe during that season were Charlie Gallagher, John Hughes, Joe McBride and Willie O'Neill.

See also
1967 European Cup Final
1966–67 European Cup
1966–67 Celtic F.C. season
1966–67 in Scottish football

References

External links
Local Heroes: The story of the Lisbon Lions, by Chris Hunt, published in FourFourTwo magazine, June 2007
Year of Triumph a scanned-in commemorative magazine from 1967.
Lisbon Lions site in Norwegian.
Match report from the Guardian, 1967.
Celtic 67 more recent picture of two of the Lisbon Lions.
Football's Greatest Teams - Celtic

Celtic F.C.
Nicknamed groups of association football players
1966–67 in Scottish football
Scottish Football Hall of Fame inductees
1966–67 European Cup